Džbánov is a municipality and village in Ústí nad Orlicí District in the Pardubice Region of the Czech Republic. It has about 400 inhabitants.

Etymology
The name of the village probably originates in the personal name Čban that belonged to one of the first reeves or settlers. Later the village was called Čbánov and then Džbánov.

Geography
It lies in the Svitavy Uplands.

History
Džbánov was founded in the mid-13th century. The first written mention of Džbánov is from 1292. In the 14th century, it was property of the Zbraslav Monastery. After the Hussite Wars, the village property was split between several placeholders (the emperor, the town of Vysoké Mýto, royal chamber, and the noble family of Kostka of Postupice). The town of Vysoké Mýto owned the whole village from the late 16th century to 1850. Afterwards the village became autonomous municipality.

References

External links

Villages in Ústí nad Orlicí District